is a Japanese footballer currently playing as a midfielder for Blacktown City in Australia.

Career statistics

Club
.

Notes

References

External links

1996 births
Living people
People from Tsushima, Aichi
Association football people from Aichi Prefecture
Chuo University alumni
Biwako Seikei Sport College alumni
Japanese footballers
Japanese expatriate footballers
Association football midfielders
J3 League players
Nagoya Grampus players
Fukushima United FC players